County Route 18 (CR 18) is a county-maintained highway in western Otsego County, New York, in the United States. The highway runs along the eastern bank of the Unadilla River and parallels NY 8, which follows the western bank of the river. CR 18 enters the vicinity of several villages and hamlets, including the village of New Berlin and the hamlet of Unadilla Forks.

The portion of CR 18 between Unadilla Forks and U.S. Route 20 (US 20) in Plainfield—a distance of —was originally maintained by the state of New York. It was added to the state highway system in 1916 and designated as New York State Route 413 . The NY 413 designation was removed in the early 1950s.

Route description

Mount Upton to New Berlin
CR 18 begins at an intersection with NY 51 in the town of Butternuts, located east of the hamlet of Mount Upton on the eastern bank of the Unadilla River. CR 18 heads northward, passing along the base of the Unadilla River valley as it heads along the east bank of the river and parallels NY 8, which runs along the western bank. As the route heads away from Mount Upton, it heads through a dense forest situated at the foot of the valley's eastern edge. The forest continues to surround CR 18 until the vicinity of Lathams Corners, where the forest gives way to open fields and smaller, isolated patches of trees.

North of Lathams Corners, CR 18 serves as a divider between a series of cultivated fields on the east bank of the river and a dense forest enveloping the eastern edge of the valley. The route continues to parallel both NY 8 and the Unadilla River into the hamlet of South New Berlin, a community centered around the intersection of NY 8 and NY 23. CR 18 meets NY 23 a short distance to the east at a junction situated on the Butternuts–Morris town line. Past the intersection, CR 18 passes through the eastern extents of the hamlet before continuing northeastward through open fields.

It passes by the hamlet of Silver Lake, named for a small lake of the same name to the west of the highway and east of the community, as it approaches the village of New Berlin. Southeast of New Berlin, CR 18 intersects CR 13, a southeastward extension of New Berlin's South Main Street. While NY 8 directly enters the village, which is situated on the west bank of the river, CR 18 bypasses it to the east. The route crosses over Wharton Creek and intersects NY 80 in an area known as Hoboken before leaving the vicinity of New Berlin.

New Berlin to Bridgewater 
North of New Berlin, CR 18 continues to follow a routing parallel to that of the Unadilla River and NY 8, which is joined by NY 80 in New Berlin. NY 80 splits off to the northwest just over  later while NY 8 and CR 18 continue northward. The highways reenter a rural area, with forests and fields again surrounding the highways as CR 18 passes into the town of Edmeston. The county route enters the hamlet of South Edmeston, where it intersects with CR 20. CR 18 turns east here, overlapping CR 20 for approximately  before leaving the route and turning back to the north.

CR 18 continues on through the rural town, passing along the eastern base of the river valley as it intersects CR 18C (Welsh Road), a connector route linking CR 18 to the hamlet of West Edmeston and NY 8. From there, the route heads northeastward through open fields and isolated forests before crossing into the town of Plainfield. Here, CR 18 meets CR 19, an east–west highway connecting CR 18 to the community of Leonardsville. Here, it connects to its two other suffixed routes, both of which connect to county routes in adjacent counties.

As the name implies, Unadilla Forks is the location where the Unadilla River splits into two branches. Just north of its junction with CR 18A, CR 18 crosses over the Unadilla River's eastern branch. While the east branch heads off to the northeast, CR 18 follows the west branch northward through a low-lying area in the center of the Unadilla River valley composed mostly of open fields. The west branch of the river continues north into the village of Bridgewater, a community based around the junction of NY 8 and US 20; however, CR 18 bypasses the village to the east. CR 18 intersects US 20 east of the village before crossing into Oneida County and becoming that county's CR 2.

History

The portion of CR 18 between CR 18A in Unadilla Forks and US 20 in Plainfield—a distance of —was originally a state-maintained highway. It was added to the New York state highway system on January 12, 1916, and designated as NY 413 . The NY 413 designation was removed in the early 1950s.

In late 1932, the entire NY 413 was closed to traffic as part of a project to completely reconstruct the road. It was completed and reopened .

Signage for county routes in Otsego County were posted in July 1965.

Major intersections

Suffixed routes 
CR 18 has three suffixed routes that serve as connectors between CR 18 and county routes in adjacent counties.

CR 18A connects CR 18 in Unadilla Forks to the Herkimer County line at Plainfield, where it becomes CR 162. It is the longest of CR 18's three suffixed routes.
CR 18B links CR 18 in Unadilla Forks to the Madison County line just west of Unadilla Forks, where it becomes CR 84.
CR 18C serves as a connector between CR 18 in Edmeston and the Madison County line at West Edmeston, where it becomes CR 94.

References

External links

18